PTFF may refer to:
Pertrochanteric femur fracture 
Port Townsend Film Festival